Nathan E. "Ned" Davis (born 1945/1946, Nashville), is an American financial analyst, finance author, and co-founder of the Ned Davis Research Group (NDRG), a data-driven investment research company based in Venice, Florida.

Early life and education
Davis was born in Nashville, went to school at the University School of Nashville graduating in 1963, and did his undergraduate degree at the University of North Carolina at Chapel Hill, majoring in French.

Career 
He dropped out of Harvard Business School as he found he was more interested in finance and investment than management, and returned to Nashville to spend 12 years working at the regional investment bank, J.C. Bradford & Co. At J.C. Bradford, Davis met Ed Mendel, and the two became interested in the idea of using computers to analyze investment data, however, their request in 1979 to the company for US$30,000 to buy a mainframe computer was declined. At the time, Davis was a partner in the firm, and his investment views were covered nationally in publications such as The Washington Post.

Ned Davis Research (1980–)
In 1980, Davis and Mendel co-founded the Ned Davis Research Group (NDRG) in Venice, Florida starting with 5 employees, to focus on computer data analysis driven investment research and advice for trading firms. Davis focused on the analysis, and Mendel focused on the business model and business management. In 2011, NDRG was sold to the global financial publishing company Euromoney for circa 173 million; Davis remained with the company after the transaction. As well as its Venice headquarters, NDRG had branches in Atlanta, Boston, San Francisco, and London, with over 1,000 global institutional investment clients, including Fidelity Investments and the Charles Schwab Corporation.

Davis (and NDRG), is a frequent contributor to the Wall Street Journal, Financial Times, Bloomberg News, CNBC, Barron's, and other financial publications.  Their quantitative and technical research on various long-term data series in markets is used as reference in publications such as The Encyclopedia Of Technical Market Indicators, as well as in their own publications.

In April 2013, finance author Barry Ritholtz said, "Ned Davis may be the single most highly respected Technical Analyst working today", and interviewed Davis for the Bloomberg: Masters in Business (MiB) series, where Davis said: "We are in the business of making mistakes. The only difference between the winners and the losers is that the winners make small mistakes, while the losers make big mistakes".

Davis has been described as a follower of contrarian investing, who warns against situations of  very strong consensus or herd mentality.

Published works

Davis has published a number of books on finance, which have been re-published in subsequent editions:

See also
Technical analysis
Fed model

References

External links
Ned Davis Research (official website)
Profile of Ned Davis (BCA Research)
Ned Davis Profile (CMT Association)

American financial analysts
American financial company founders
American financial writers
People from Nashville, Tennessee
University of North Carolina at Chapel Hill alumni
Living people
Technical analysts
American finance and investment writers
American financial commentators
American financial businesspeople
Year of birth missing (living people)